Eurypleuron is a genus of pearlfishes, with these currently recognized species:
 Eurypleuron cinereum (J. L. B. Smith, 1955)
 Eurypleuron owasianum (Matsubara, 1953) (eel pearlfish)

References

Carapidae